The A Day at the Races Tour (also known as the World Tour '77, Summer Tour 1977 and the Jubilee Tour) was the fourth headlining concert tour by the British rock band Queen, supporting their late 1976 album A Day at the Races.

Background
This tour was the first in which the band played "Somebody to Love" and many others. "Brighton Rock" and "Bohemian Rhapsody" were performed full-length for the first time. Also, singer Freddie Mercury performed a vocal canon between "White Man" and "The Prophet's Song".

"When people started singing along, we found it kind of annoying…" recalled Brian May. "Then there was an enormous realisation, at Bingley Hall in the Midlands. They sang every note of every song. Freddie and I looked at each other and went, 'Something's happening here. We've been fighting it, and we should be embracing it.' That's where 'We Will Rock You' and 'We Are the Champions' came from. It was an epoch-making moment."

The opening act for most of the North American concerts was Thin Lizzy. In New York City, the concert at Madison Square Garden sold out within moments of tickets going on sale.

The final two shows at the Earls Court Exhibition Centre were recorded, with the band using an expensive lighting rig in the shape of a crown for the first time. Both shows were also professionally recorded on video and the first can be found on many bootlegs. Of one such release – Top Fax, Pix And Info – photographer Ross Halfin said: "It was a Silver Jubilee show. This had excellent soundboard quality. I actually shot this show as a much younger man."

Tour band
Freddie Mercury: Lead vocals, piano, tambourine.
Brian May: Guitar, backing vocals, banjo ("Bring Back That Leroy Brown").
Roger Taylor: Drums, backing vocals.
John Deacon: Bass guitar, additional vocals, triangle.

Opening acts
Thin Lizzy 
Cheap Trick 
Head East 
The Outlaws

Set list
This set list is representative of the 23 January 1977 performance in Richfield, Ohio. It does not represent all the set lists for the duration of the tour.

"A Day At The Races Overture"
"Tie Your Mother Down"
"Ogre Battle"
"White Queen"
"Somebody To Love"
"Killer Queen"
"The Millionaire Waltz"
"You're My Best Friend"
"Bring Back That Leroy Brown"
"Sweet Lady"
"Brighton Rock"
"'39"
"You Take My Breath Away"
"White Man"
"The Prophet's Song"
"Bohemian Rhapsody"
"Stone Cold Crazy"
"Keep Yourself Alive"
"Liar"
"In The Lap Of The Gods... Revisited"
"Now I'm Here"
Encore
"Big Spender"
"Jailhouse Rock"
"God Save The Queen"

Tour dates

Box office score data

Cancelled shows

External links
 North American Dates
 European Dates

Notes

References

1977 concert tours
Queen (band) concert tours